In the Bombay riots in December 1992 and January 1993, an estimated 900 people died. The riots were mainly due to escalations of hostilities after large scale protests by Muslims in reaction to the 1992 Babri Masjid Demolition by Hindu Karsevaks in Ayodhya; and by Hindu mobs in regards with the Ram Temple issue.

The violence was widely reported as having been orchestrated by D-Company and their associates with the help of local Muslims. Later the Shiv Sena, a Hindu-nationalist political party in Maharashtra also participated in riots to respond the violence against them. A high-ranking member of the special branch later stated that the police were fully aware of the Shiv Sena's capabilities to commit acts of violence, and that they had incited hate against the minority communities. Historian Barbara Metcalf has described the riots as an anti-Muslim pogrom, where the official death toll was of 275 Hindus, 575 Muslims and 50  others.

The riots were followed by the 1993 Bombay Bombings.

Background

The Bombay riots can be considered a result of larger communal tensions throughout India. The British colonial policy of Divide and Rule allegedly included administrative and political activities such as communalized census taking, and the Morley Minto reforms, that relied on communal segregation, and in particular Hindu-Muslim divisions. Post-Independence, the after-effects of the Partition of India along communal lines, the resurgence of 'Hindu Muslim Economic competition', and political strategies of 'appeasement' towards communal political influences by secular political authorities (see Shah Bano case), reinforced communalist ideologies in the country. The Babri Mosque demolition on 6 December 1992, an act of communal violence by Hindutva activists, is considered to be the immediate cause of the riots.

Overview of the riot 

As determined by the government's Srikrishna commission; the riots started as a result of communal tension prevailing in the city after the Babri Mosque demolition on 6 December 1992. The Commission identified two phases to the riots. The first was mainly a Muslim instigation as a result of the Babri Masjid demolition in the week immediately succeeding 7 December 1992 led by political leaders representing Hindutva in the city of Ayodhya. The second phase was a Hindu backlash occurring as a result of the killings of Hindu Mathadi Kamgar (workers) by Muslim fanatics in Dongri (an area of South Bombay), stabbing of Hindus in Muslim majority areas and burning of six Hindus, including a disabled girl in Radhabai Chawl. This phase occurred in January 1993, with most incidents reported between 6 and 20 January.

The Report asserted that the communal passions of the Hindus were aroused to fever pitch by the inciting writings in print media, particularly Saamna and Navaakal which gave exaggerated accounts of the Mathadi murders and the Radhabai Chawl incident. From 8 January 1993, many riots occurred between Hindus led by the Shiv Sena and Muslims potentially funded by the Bombay underworld at that time. An estimated 575 Muslims and 275 Hindus were killed at the end of the riot. The communal violence and rioting triggered off by the burning at Dongri and Radhabhai Chawl, and the following retaliatory violence by Shiv Sena was hijacked by local criminal elements who potential opportunity to make quick gains. By the time the right wing Hindu organization Shiv Sena realised that enough had been done by way of "retaliation", the violence and rioting was beyond the control of its leaders who had to issue an appeal to put an end to it.

Role of the Shiv Sena 
The violence was widely reported as having been orchestrated by the Shiv Sena, a Hindu-nationalist political party in Maharashtra. A high-ranking member of the special branch later stated that the police were fully aware of the Shiv Sena's capabilities to commit acts of violence, and that they had incited hate against the minority communities. Historian Barbara Metcalf has stated that the riots were anti-Muslim pogrom. Bal Thackeray, the leader of the Shiv Sena, was arrested in July 2000 for his complicity in the riots and for 'inflammatory writings' that may have helped propagate the riots. The case was later dismissed.

Justice B.N. Srikrishna Commission

Justice Srikrishna, then a relatively junior Judge of the Bombay High Court, accepted the task of investigating the causes of the riots, something that many of his colleagues had turned down. For five years until 1998, he examined victims, witnesses and alleged perpetrators. Detractors came initially from left quarters who were wary of a judge who was a devout and practising Hindu. The commission was disbanded by the Shiv Sena led government in January 1996 and on public opposition was later reconstituted on 28 May 1996; though when it was reconstituted its terms of reference were extended to include the Bombay bomb blasts that followed in March 1993.

The report of the commission stated that the tolerant and secular foundations of the city were holding even if a little shakily. Justice Srikrishna indicted those he alleged as largely responsible for the second phase of the bloodshed and to some extent the first, the Shiv Sena.

The report was criticised as "politically motivated". For a while, its contents were a closely guarded secret and no copies were available. The Shiv Sena government rejected its recommendations. Since under the Commissions of Inquiry Act, an Inquiry is not a court of law (even if it conducts proceedings like a court of law) and the report of an inquiry is not binding on Governments, Srikrishna's recommendations cannot be directly enforced. To date, the recommendations of the Commission have neither been accepted nor acted upon by the Maharashtra Government.  Many indicted policemen were promoted by the government and indicted politicians continue to hold high political office even today.

According to the commission report, the causes of these riots were listed as 
 Class Conflict
 Economic Competition
 Decline of employment
 Population density
 changing political discourse.
The immediate causes were listed as
 the demolition of Babri Masjid
 the aggravation of Muslim sentiments by the Hindus with their celebration rallies
 the insensitive and harsh approach of the police while handling the protesting mobs which initially were not violent.

Arrests, convictions and verdict
Only 3 convictions happened in the 1992-93 Bombay riots cases. On 10 July 2008, a Mumbai court sentenced former Shiv Sena MP Madhukar Sarpotdar and two other party activists to a year's rigorous imprisonment in connection with the riots. However, he was immediately granted bail. He died on 20 February 2010 without serving his sentence.

In popular culture

The riots are portrayed in several different films:

 They are the key plot in the 1995 film Bombay in which the protagonists, a Muslim wife and her Hindu husband, are separated from their children during the riots.
 The 2004 Hindi film Black Friday deals with the events leading to the riots and the aftermath which led to the 1993 Bombay bomb blasts, and related investigations, told through the different stories of the people involved – police, conspirators, victims, middlemen.
 The violence is also an instrumental part of the plot of the film Slumdog Millionaire. The protagonist, Jamal Malik's mother is among those killed in the riots, and he later remarks "If it wasn't for Rama and Allah, we'd still have a mother."
 The event also appeared in 2010 film Striker, 2000 film Fiza and 2013 film Shahid.
The Bombay Riots set the background for the popular Netflix TV Series Sacred Games, which began in 2018. The TV Series shows the rivalry of the protagonist, Ganesh Gaitonde's gang & Isa's gang amidst religious clashes.

References

Sources

 
 
 
 
  (a critique of judicial activism in India).
  (a critique of Indian and Western interpretative techniques).
 Praveen Swami  (examining the Justice Srikrishna Commission's indictment of Bal Thackeray and the Shiv Sena).
  (discussing Justice Srikrishna's Hindu beliefs and his work with the commission).
 

Anti-Muslim violence in India
History of Mumbai (1947–present)
Riots and civil disorder in India
1992 riots
1993 riots
Religious riots
Religiously motivated violence in India
1992 in India
1993 in India
Rao administration
1990s in Mumbai
Crime in Mumbai
December 1992 events in Asia
January 1993 events in Asia
Mass murder in 1993
People murdered by Indian organised crime
Organised crime events in India
D-Company
1992 murders in India
1993 murders in India
Massacres in India